Harry Johan Olai Klippenvåg (12 May 1913 – 11 November 1994) was a Norwegian politician for the Labour Party.

He was born in Lurøy.

He was elected to the Norwegian Parliament from Finnmark in 1950, and was re-elected on four occasions.

Klippenvåg was mayor of Sør-Varanger municipality during the terms 1947–1951 and 1951–1955. He was also a member of Finnmark county council from 1947–1949.

References

1913 births
1994 deaths
Labour Party (Norway) politicians
Members of the Storting
20th-century Norwegian politicians